The 2014–15 Creighton Bluejays men's basketball team represented Creighton University during the 2014–15 NCAA Division I men's basketball season. The Bluejays, led by fifth-year head coach Greg McDermott, played their home games at the CenturyLink Center Omaha, and were members of the Big East Conference. They finished the season 14–19, 4–14 in Big East play to finish in a tie for ninth place. They advanced to the quarterfinals of the Big East tournament where they lost to Georgetown.

Previous season 
The Bluejays finished the season with an overall record of 27–8, with a record of 14–4 in the Big East regular season for a second-place finish. In the 2014 Big East tournament, the Bluejays were defeated by Providence, 65–58 in the championship game. They were invited to the 2014 NCAA Men's Division I Basketball Tournament which they defeated Louisiana–Lafayette in the second round before losing to Baylor in third round.

Off season

Departures

Incoming transfers

Incoming recruits

Roster

Depth chart

Rankings

Schedule and results 

|-
!colspan=9 style="background:#0C5FA8; color:#FFFFFF;"| Exhibition

|-
!colspan=9 style="background:#0C5FA8; color:#FFFFFF;"| Non-Conference Regular Season

|-
!colspan=9 style="background:#0C5FA8; color:#FFFFFF;"| Big East Conference Play

|-
!colspan=12 style="background:#0C5FA8; color:#FFFFFF;"| Big East tournament

References

Creighton Bluejays
Creighton Bluejays men's basketball seasons
2014 in sports in Nebraska
2015 in sports in Nebraska